Saint-Cybranet is a commune in the Dordogne department in Nouvelle-Aquitaine in southwestern France.

Geography
The river Céou forms part of the commune's southeastern border, then flows north-northwest through its eastern part.

Population

See also
Communes of the Dordogne department

References

External links

Official site

Communes of Dordogne